Theodor Willem Johannes Juynboll also: Theodorus Willem Johannes Juijnboll, Theodorus Guiliemus Johannes Juynboll (April 6, 1802 in Rotterdam – September 16, 1861 in Leiden) was a Dutch Reformed theologian and oriental philologist.

Life 
Theodor Juynboll was the son of Gualterus Johannes Juynboll and Catharina Johanna Pla.  After his mother died early in his childhood, his father married Johanna Deel and the family moved to The Hague where Theodor attended Latin school.  In 1821 he enrolled in theology and Semitic languages at the University of Leiden under Hendrik Arent Hamaker (1789–1835) and Johannes Hendricus van der Palm. His undergraduate thesis won him early recognition and in 1828 he earned his doctorate of theology..

In 1828, he entered the parish ministry of Voorhout, where he worked as a pastor until 1831 when he succeeded Groenewoud as professor of semitic languages at the Athenaeum in Franeker.  He taught Hebrew and Semitic languages and Jewish antiquities and later the Old Testament and Arab writers. He held the Alternate Rectorate of the Educational Institution from 1834 to 1836. In 1840 he became a corresponding member of the Royal Institute of the Netherlands. In the same year he received a royal honor as a professor of Oriental languages and Hebrew history at the University of Groningen. In 1841 he succeeded G. Wolters in Groningen university and 4 years later H. E. Weijers, in Leiden. As adjudicator he had R. Dozy (1846–1850) and later Pieter de Jong (1859–1861)  and de Goeje.
In 1845, he received an honorary doctorate of philosophy from the Senate of Groningen University, a professorship at the Faculty of Philosophy, Leiden University, teaching Oriental languages Arabic, Chaldean, Syriac, and Hebrew.  In 1853/54, he became rector of his Alma Mater.

Juynboll was a friend and colleague of the orientalist Ferdinand Wüstenfeld.  When Juynboll died prematurely, Wüstenfeld continued his translation work of the great geographic encyclopedia, Mu'jam al-Buldan by Yaqut al-Hamawi, on which Juynboll had been editing an  abridgement titled, Marâsid al ittilâ. In 1829, Juynboll ad Wilhelmina Eva Verkouteren (1802–1871) at Voorhout. Their son Abraham Wilhelm Theodorus Juynboll (1833–1887), also gained renown as a philologist.

Orations
 Oratio de hodierna studii linguarum orientalium conditione. (Franeker 1832)
 Oratio de Henrico Arentio Hamakero, studii literarum oo in patria nostra vindice praeclaro, Dicta publice The XXI septembris A. MDCCCXXXVI, Quum athenaei, quod Franequerae est, regundi munus solenni ritu deponeret. 1837
Oratio de gente Sammaritano (1841)
Oratio de praecipuis progressibus, quos literae semiticae hoc ipso decennio fecerunt (1845)
Oratio de Codicum Orientalium, quae in Academia Lugduno-Batava servantur Bibliotheca (1853–54)

Works

Much of Juynboll's works deal with the history and literature of the Samaritans:
A Study on an Arabic Translation of the Pentateuch (Orientalia II, 113 acc.; Amsterdam, 1846).
Commentarii in historiam gentis Samaritanae. (Leiden, 1846).
 Chronicon samaritanum arabice conscriptum cui titulus est Liber Joshua. (Leiden 1848)
The Arabic text of a Samaritan chronicle: Chronicon samaritanum arabice conscriptum cui titulus est Liber Josuae (Leiden, 1848).
 Commentatio ad quaestionem ab Ordine Philosophorum et Literatorum propositam: Exponantur causae quibus effectum sit, ut regnum Iudae diutius persisteret quam regnum Israel. (Lyons, 1824).
 Disputatio de Amoso ejusque scriptis ac veteribus eorum interpretibus, pars prima. (Leiden, 1828)
 Letter-bound Bijdragen. (3rd part; Leiden, 1838)
 Sermo de Henrieo Engelino Wyers. (Groningen, 1844)
Juda en de Assyrische macht gedurende de jaren 741-711 (PhD. Thesis; Leiden, 1863)

Edited Texts
Lexicon geographicum, cui titulus est, Marâsid al ittilâ’ ‘ala asmâ’ al-amkina wa-l-biqâ, 6 vols, 1852[-]64;
Kitab al-Buldan of Yaqubi, Ahmad ibn Abi Yaqub (d. 897?)
Jaqubi's Kitab al-boldan als: Specimen... exhibens Kitabo'l-Boldan (Lugd. Bat., 1861).
 Lexicon geographicum. 
Ibn Taghribirdi's Annals, (unfinished). 4 parts of the first work (Leiden 1850–1864, 1 part Arabic text, in collaboration with J.J.B. Gaal, 3 parts introduction and notes, 2 of which were posthumous). Two parts of the latter have been published, partly in collaboration with B.F. Matthes (Leiden, 1851–1861).
 Abü'l-Mahäsin ibn Tagri Bardii Annales  (Leiden, 1857).
Licht gezonden van het Mohammedaansch rechtsboek At-Tanbih auctor Abu Ishak As-Shirazi (Leiden, 1879) 
al-Tanbīh fī al-fiqh ʻalá madhhab al-Imām al-Shāfiʻī, "Exhortation on fiqh in the doctrine of Imam Shafi'i" by Abū Isḥāq Ibrāhīm ibn ʻAlī ibn Yūsuf Fīrūzābādī al-Shīrāzī (Arabic text; Lugd. Bat., 1879).
(1853), (AAAAcAAJ 1859)

Notes

Citations

References

 (online beim Instituut voor Nederlandse Geschiedenis or the Digitale Bibliotheek voor de Nederlandse Letteren, niederländisch).
.
*

External links 

 T. W. J. Juynboll at the Digital Library of Dutch Literature
 Member Record in KNAW
 in the professor catalog of the University of Groningen

1802 births
1861 deaths
Dutch Arabists
Dutch Calvinist and Reformed theologians
Dutch orientalists
Dutch philologists
Academic staff of Leiden University
Members of the Royal Netherlands Academy of Arts and Sciences
Old Testament scholars
Semiticists
Academic staff of the University of Groningen